"Aqua Vita" is the second segment of the twenty-sixth episode (the second episode of the second season (1986–87)) of the television series The Twilight Zone. It was written by Paul Chitlik and Jeremy Bertrand Finch, who went on to become story editors of the syndicated version of the show from 1988 to 1989. In this segment, an aging news anchor is referred to a company which sells bottled water from the Fountain of Youth.

Plot
Christine, a 40-year-old news anchor, worries that she will lose her job to someone younger. Her husband Marc, a fashion photographer still in his 30s, remains passionate about Christine, but she fears losing him to one of the many attractive models he works with. Her colleague Shauna, who is 47 years old but looks 30, says the secret to her youthful appearance is a bottled water called "Aqua Vita". Christine orders some. The delivery man says the first batch is free and that after the initial dose only one glass a day is needed.

Ratings on Christine's show go up in response to her de-aging, saving her job. Marc is pleased by Christine's more youthful appearance, but he becomes irate when she aborts their romantic three-day getaway so that she can get her daily dose of Aqua Vita, since she cannot bring it outside of the house. Moreover, at the end of each day Aqua Vita makes the user appear elderly, an effect which only stops when another dose is taken. Contrary to the delivery man's promise, Christine begins to require multiple glasses to get the same effect. Shauna asks Christine for a massive loan. She learns the reason when the Aqua Vita delivery man tells her the second batch costs $5,000. She realizes she could have Aqua Vita investigated for deceptive business practices, but refrains from doing so so that she can keep getting the water.

Marc is increasingly worried by Christine's secretive behavior, especially when he finds her up in the middle of the night guzzling water from the Aqua Vita dispenser and she refuses to give him an explanation. He goes to Shauna for answers, and his suspicions are further aroused when Shauna refuses to let him in her room but immediately opens the door for the Aqua Vita delivery man. He glances inside and sees Shauna appears elderly.

Marc tells Christine she needs to stop taking Aqua Vita. He points out that the withdrawal effects only make her look old, and she is qualified for jobs which do not require her to look youthful. He also says her appearance will not affect their relationship, but she says he is being unrealistic, and that the disparity in their apparent ages will be an increasing embarrassment. Recognizing the truth in this, Marc drinks the water himself in order to join her in looking old. They sit together on a park bench, condemned to look old for the rest of their lives, but happy to spend these years together.

External links 
 

The Twilight Zone (1985 TV series season 2) episodes
1986 American television episodes
Television episodes about immortality

fr:L'Éternelle Jeunesse